X-Faktor is a Hungarian television music competition to find new singing talent. The fifth series was broadcast on RTL Klub in 2014. Bence Istenes presented his second series of X-Faktor. Róbert Szikora, Gabi Tóth and Róbert Alföldi all returned to judge the talent for the second time. Gábor Szűcs, a new judge joined them, replacing the original judge Péter Geszti.

The series lowered the age limit from 16 to 14.

Judges and presenters
Geszti, the only original judge left, announced his intention to leave the show after the fourth series to concentrate on his music career. The three other judges returned for a second series with the new judge Szűcs whose stage name is Little G. Weevil.

The original host, Nóra Ördög, was to return to the show for this series, but she became pregnant. RTL asked Bence Istenes back to host the show for a second run.

Auditions
Open auditions took place in Budapest on 10 May 2014. The judges' auditions started on 31 May in Budapest.

Bootcamp
The bootcamp was broadcast on 4 and 5 October.

The contestants sang live for an audience and the judges. At the end of the day, the judges revealed the 24 remaining acts for the judges' houses.

Judges' houses
At this stage of the competition each judge mentored six acts. Each judge had help from a guest judge to choose their final acts.

The twelve eliminated acts were:
Boys: Balázs Karancs, Benji (Le Quang Huy), László Sallai
Girls: Anasztázia Bordás, Andrea Cseh, Gwendolin Krizsma
Over 25s: Albero Erika, Ági Horváth, Krisztián Horváth
Groups: Phoenix Rt, Rock-Inger, Rosewood

Contestants
Key:
 – Winner
 – Runner-up
 – Third place

Results summary
{|
|-
| – mentored by Róbert Szikora (girls)
|| – Bottom two
|-
| – mentored by Róbert Alföldi (boys)
| – Safe
|-
| – mentored by Gabi Tóth (groups)
|-
| – mentored by Gábor Szűcs (over 25s)
|}

Live shows

Week 1 (18 October)
 Theme: Songs that describe the contestants
 Celebrity performer: Dóra Danics ("Jelenidő")
 Group performance: "Lay Me Down"

Judge's vote to eliminate
 Tóth: Izabella Jakab-Péter
 Szikora: Pálinka Republik  
 Alföldi: Pálinka Republik
 Szűcs: Pálinka Republik

Week 2 (25 October)
 Theme: Love songs
 Celebrity performer: Gergő Rácz ("Shotgun")
 Group performance: "One"

Judge's vote to eliminate
 Szűcs: Jenifer Ilyés
 Szikora: Jonathan Andelic
 Tóth: Jenifer Ilyés
 Alföldi: Jenifer Ilyés

Week 3 (1 November)
 Theme: Songs by deceased artists
 Celebrity performer: ByeAlex ("Az én rózsám")
 Group performance: "Imádok élni" with the judges

Judge's vote to eliminate
 Szűcs: Zsófi Kállai-Kiss
 Szikora: Zsófi Kállai-Kiss
 Tóth: Zsófi Kállai-Kiss
 Alföldi: Zsósi Kállai-Kiss

Week 4 (8 November)
 Theme: Current party songs
 Celebrity performer: Kelemen Kabátban ("Maradjatok gyerekek")
 Group performance: "Bang Bang"

Judge's vote to eliminate
 Alföldi: Richárd Szabó
 Tóth: Richárd Szabó
 Szikora: Richárd Borbély
 Szűcs: Richárd Szabó

Week 5 (15 November)
 Theme: Songs sung by the contestants opposite sex
 Celebrity performer: Honeybeast ("Egyedül")
 Group performance: "Little Talks"

Judge's vote to eliminate
 Szűcs: Jonathan Andelic
 Szikora: Jonathan Andelic
 Tóth: Juli Horányi
 Alföldi: Jonathan Andelic

Week 6 (22 November)
 Theme: Success, money, glamour
 Celebrity performer: Gergő Oláh ("A tükör előtt")
 Group performance: "Hall of Fame"

Judge's vote to eliminate
 Tóth: Izabella Jakab-Péter
 Szikora: Tha Shudras
 Alföldi: Izabella Jakab-Péter
 Szűcs: Tha Shudras

Week 7 (29 November)
 Theme: Rock
 Celebrity performer: Illés-együttes" ("Miért hagytuk, hogy így legyen?"), Bea Palya ("Szabadon")
 Group performance: "Amikor én még kissrác voltam", "Hé’ 67’" with András Kern

Judge's vote to eliminate
 Alföldi: Tha Shudras
 Tóth: Richárd Borbély
 Szikora: Richárd Borbély
 Szűcs: Tha Shudras

Week 8 (6 December)
 Theme: All that jazz
 Celebrity performer: Tibor Kocsis ("Hello Budapest")
 Group performance: "Santa Claus Is Coming to Town"

Judge's vote to eliminate
 Alföldi: Spoon
 Tóth: Benji
 Szikora: Spoon
 Szűcs: Spoon

Week 9 (13 December)
 Theme: Film songs
 Celebrity performer: The Biebers ("Memories")
 Group performance: "Changing"

Judge's vote to eliminate
 Alföldi: Tha Shudras
 Tóth: Benji
 Szikora: Benji
 Szűcs: Tha Shudras

Week 10 (20/21 December)
Saturday
 Theme: Mentors' favourite song of the series, duet with a surprise partner
 Celebrity performer: Szabó Balázs Bandája feat. Julie Rens ("Hétköznapi")
 Group performance: "Animals"

Sunday
 Theme: Act's choice, Christmas, contestants' favorite performance, winner's single
 Celebrity performer: Dóra Danics, Csaba Vastag
 Group performance: "Meglepetés" (all finalists)

References

2014 Hungarian television seasons
Hungary 05